Mataguži is a village in the Podgorica municipality of Montenegro. It is located in the Upper Zeta region, just north of Lake Skadar. It is named after the medieval Mataguzi tribe that lived in the region and founded the original settlement.

Demographics
According to the 2003 census, the village had a population of 1,299 people.

According to the 2011 census, its population was 1,292.

References

Populated places in Podgorica Municipality